Abul Kashem Khan (best known as A. K. Khan; 5 April 1905 – 31 March 1991) was a Bangladeshi lawyer, industrialist and politician. In 1945, he founded A K Khan & Company, one of Pakistan's leading conglomerates until 1971, when it became one of Bangladesh's leading conglomerates. Khan served as a member of the Constituent Assembly of India and the Constituent Assembly of Pakistan. He was a federal minister of Pakistan and member in the Pakistan National Assembly.

Early life 
He was born in an aristocratic family in the village of Mohara in Panchlaish in Chittagong in 1905. His father, Abdul Latif Khan, was a government sub-registrar at Fatehabad, Chittagong, and his mother's name was Wahabun Nessa Khan. Khan's great-great-great grandfather, Shamsher Khan, was a rich politician and minister in the city of Gour in the 16th century. Khan studied law at Presidency College, Calcutta. In 1934 he joined the Kolkata High court as an advocate. He joined the judicial branch of the Bengali Civil service in 1935. He continued in the service till 1944.

Career 
Khan entered business during the Second World War in 1945, when Chittagong was a key base for Allied Forces. A variety of industries, including a match factory, a plywood factory, a garment mill, and a dockyard, have been stepped up by him. He was elected a member of the Constituent Assembly of India from the All-India Muslim League candidate in 1946. He joined the Pakistan Constituent Assembly after the partition of India. In 1951-1952 budget he spoke against the economical discrimination of East Pakistan.

"Sir, I cannot help' remark ' which I hope will not be misinterpreted as an indication of petty provincial-mindedness. Sir, these are the days of decentralisation and regional self-sufficiency. We find that in this six-year plan, the total sum allocated to East Bengal where 56 percent of your people live is less than 23 percent. Under the head 'Agriculture', provision has been made for 82 crores and a sum total of all the projects envisaged for East Bengal is only 5.6 crores. Under the head 'Development of Hydro-Electric Power', a provision for 45 crores has been made and the share of East Bengal is only 5 crores. Under the head 'Industries', provision has been made for textile industries' [for West Pakistan] to the tune of 30 crores and the provision for jute industry' [for East Bengal] is only 11 crores. Now, Sir, this gives a clear indication that not only in the past, not only in the present, but in the future development plans of the country, East Bengal is not expected to get its legitimate share."

Politics
He was the minister of Industries, Works, Irrigation, Power and Mineral Resources from 1958 to 1962. From 1962 to 1964 he was a member of the national assembly of Pakistan. He retired from politics in 1965.

Personal life 
Khan married his wife Shamsun Nahar Khan in 1935. She was the daughter of a wealthy merchant, Abdul Bari Chowdhury, who owned industries in British Burma. Abdul Bari owned a shipping company and multiple rice mills in Rangoon until the Japanese invasion of Burma, after which he moved to Chittagong. In Chittagong, he established a shipping company called the Bengal-Burma Steam Navigation Company, the first maritime company in the area to challenge the dominance of the British India Steam Navigation Company. 
Chowdhury also served as a director of the Pakistan Industrial Credit and Investment Corporation.

Khan had nine children with Shamsun Nahar: five sons and four daughters; Zahiruddin (Bambu), Shamsuddin (Jambu), Salahuddin, Sadruddin, Ziauddin (Pablo), Latifa (Kohinoor), Zebun Nahar, Yasmin, and Shamima.
 
Khan's eldest daughter, Latifa, was married to Bangladesh's first minister of commerce and the first Bangladeshi ambassador to the United States, Mustafizur Rahman Siddiqi.

Death 
He died on 31 March 1991. His wife, Shamsun Nahar Khan, died the same year just two months after his death. He left behind nine children – five sons and four daughters.

In popular culture
AK Khan More is a circle located in Chittagong, Bangladesh near Dhaka-Chittagong Trunk Road.

References 

20th-century Bangladeshi businesspeople
Bangladeshi politicians
1905 births
1991 deaths
Bangladeshi Muslims
Members of the Constituent Assembly of India
Federal ministers of Pakistan
University of Calcutta alumni
Pakistan International Airlines people
20th-century Bangladeshi lawyers
Pakistani MNAs 1962–1965
20th-century Pakistani businesspeople
People from Chittagong District
20th-century Bengalis
Members of the Constituent Assembly of Pakistan